Viyaleta Maksimauna Skvartsova (born 15 April 1998) is a Belarusian athlete specialising in the triple jump. She represented her country at the 2021 European Indoor Championships finishing fourth. Earlier she won a bronze medal at the 2019 European U23 Championships.

International competitions

Personal bests
Outdoor
Long jump – 6.37 (+0.4 m/s, Brest 2020)
Triple jump – 14.17 (-0.3 m/s, Brest 2020)
Indoor
Long jump – 6.56 (Tartu 2020)
Triple jump – 14.39 (Toruń 2021)

Protest over misplayed anthem
At the Medal Ceremony at the 2017 European U20 Championships, Skvartsova stood down from the podium when the anthem of Bosnia and Herzegovina was played instead of the anthem of Belarus. Skvartsova waited for the flag to be raised, and then walked some distance from the podium, and waited in silent protest for the music to finish. After the music stopped, she spoke with officials, who appeared to ask her to take part in the remainder of the ceremony, which Skvartsova politely declined to do.

References

1998 births
Living people
Belarusian female triple jumpers
Belarusian female long jumpers
Sportspeople from Vitebsk
Athletes (track and field) at the 2020 Summer Olympics
Olympic athletes of Belarus